CYC or Cyc may refer to:
 Cycle gene, a circadian control gene found in Drosophila melanogaster responsible for the formation of the formation of CYC protein
 Cyc, an American artificial-intelligence project
 Champions Youth Cup, an annual international youth football (soccer) tournament
 China Youth Corps, a Taiwanese youth organization
 Cyclorama (theater), a curved fabric or plastic sheet backdrop for a stage
 Cycnoches, a genus of orchid
 Cytochrome c, a protein of the mitochondrial electron transport chain
 Cyclophosphamide, an anti-neoplastic and immunosuppressant drug